Banksiola is a genus of giant casemakers in the family Phryganeidae. There are about five described species in Banksiola.

Species
These five species belong to the genus Banksiola:
 Banksiola calva Banks, 1943
 Banksiola concatenata (Walker, 1852)
 Banksiola crotchi Banks, 1944 (traveler sedge giant casemaker)
 Banksiola dossuaria (Say, 1828)
 Banksiola smithi (Banks, 1914)

References

Further reading

 
 
 

Trichoptera genera
Articles created by Qbugbot